Alexei Akifiev (born January 22, 1976) is a Russian professional ice hockey forward who currently plays for HC Sibir Novosibirsk of the Kontinental Hockey League (KHL).

References

External links

Living people
HC Sibir Novosibirsk players
1976 births
Sportspeople from Samara, Russia
Russian ice hockey left wingers